Sir George Tyler  (28 December 1792 –  4 June 1862) was a British Royal Navy officer from who became a colonial governor and then Conservative Party politician.

The son of Admiral Sir Charles Tyler, he joined the navy in 1809,
rising to the rank of captain in 1822, rear admiral in 1852,
and vice admiral in 1857.

Tyler was made a Knight of the Royal Guelphic Order in 1833, and knighted again in November 1838. From 1833 to 1840 he was Lieutenant Governor of the island of St Vincent in the Caribbean, which it became part of the British Windward Islands.

He was elected unopposed as one of the two Members of Parliament (MPs) for Glamorganshire
at a by-election in 1851 following the resignation of Viscount Adare
He was re-elected
unopposed in 1852, and did not defend his seat at the 1857 general election.

In 1847,
1848,
1849,
and 1850
he was one of the 3 people nominated for to be High Sheriff of Glamorgan for the following year,
but was not appointed.
     
Tyler lived at a Cotterell, in Glamorgan, Wales. He died on 4 June 1862 in at Dunraven Castle, Glamorgan.

See also

References

External links 
 

1792 births
1862 deaths
Royal Navy vice admirals
UK MPs 1847–1852
UK MPs 1852–1857
Conservative Party (UK) MPs for Welsh constituencies
Members of the Parliament of the United Kingdom for Glamorganshire
Governors of British Saint Vincent and the Grenadines